Tofte Glacier is a glacier immediately south of Sandefjord Cove on the west side of Peter I Island.

References

Glaciers of Antarctica
Peter I Island
Subantarctic glaciers